The Peshmerga is the Kurdish military forces of the autonomous Kurdistan Region of Iraq. According to the Constitution of Iraq, the Peshmerga, along with their security subsidiaries, are responsible for the security of Kurdistan Region, due to the fact that the Iraqi Armed Forces are forbidden by Iraqi law to enter Iraqi Kurdistan. These subsidiaries include Asayish (intelligence agency), Parastin u Zanyarî (assisting intelligence agency) and the Zeravani (Gendarmerie). The history of Peshmerga dates back to 18th century, starting out as a strictly tribal pseudo-military border guard under the Ottomans and Safavids and later changing to a well-trained, disciplined guerrilla force in the 19th century.

Formally, the Peshmerga are under the command of the Kurdistan Regional Government's Ministry of Peshmerga Affairs. In reality, the Peshmerga force itself is largely divided and controlled separately by the two regional political parties: Democratic Party of Kurdistan and the Patriotic Union of Kurdistan. Unifying and integrating the Peshmerga has been on the public agenda since 1992, but the forces remain divided due to factionalism which has proved to be a major stumbling block.

In 2003, during the Iraq War, Peshmerga played a key role in the mission to capture Saddam Hussein. In 2004, they captured key al-Qaeda figure Hassan Ghul, who revealed the identity of Osama bin Laden's messenger, which eventually led to the killing of Osama bin Laden.

Etymology
The word "Peshmerga" can be translated to "to stand in front of death", and Valentine states it was first used by Qazi Muhammad in the short-lived Mahabad Republic (1946–47). The word is understandable to Persian speakers.

History 

The Kurdish warrior tradition of rebellion has existed for thousands of years along with aspirations for independence, and early Kurdish warriors fought against the various Persian empires, the Ottoman Empire and the British Empire.

Historically the Peshmerga existed only as guerrilla organizations, but under the self-declared Republic of Mahabad (1946–1947), the Peshmerga led by Mustafa Barzani became the official army of the republic. After the fall of the republic and the execution of head of state Qazi Muhammad, Peshmerga forces reemerged as guerrilla organizations that would go on to fight the Iranian and Iraqi governments for the remainder of the century.

In Iraq, most of these Peshmerga were led by Mustafa Barzani of the Kurdistan Democratic Party. In 1975 the Peshmerga were defeated in the Second Iraqi–Kurdish War. Jalal Talabani, a leading member of the KDP, left the same year to revitalize the resistance and founded the Patriotic Union of Kurdistan. This event created the baseline for the political discontent between the KDP and PUK that to this day divides Peshmerga forces and much of Kurdish society in Kurdistan.

After Mustafa Barzani's death in 1979, his son Masoud Barzani took his position. As tension increased between KDP and PUK, most Peshmerga fought to keep a region under their own party's control while also fighting off Iraqi Army incursions. Following the First Persian Gulf War, Iraqi Kurdistan saw the Kurdish Civil War between the two major parties, the KDP and the PUK, and Peshmerga forces were used to fight each other. The civil war officially ended in September 1998 when Barzani and Talabani signed the Washington Agreement establishing a formal peace treaty. In the agreement, the parties agreed to share revenue and power, deny the use of northern Iraq to the Kurdistan Workers' Party (PKK), and not allow Iraqi troops into the Kurdish regions. By then, around 5,000 had been killed on both sides, and many more had been evicted for being on the wrong side. In the years after, tension remained high, but both parties moved towards each other, and in 2003 they both took part in the overthrowing of the Baathist regime as part of the Iraq War. Unlike other militia forces, the Peshmerga were never prohibited by Iraqi law.
 In 2014, the Peshmerga withdrew from the Nineveh Plains which was said by the locals as being a contributing factor of the quick Islamic State victory in the invasion, and the widespread massacre of Yazidis, who were rendered defenseless.

Structure and capabilities

The Peshmerga are mostly divided among forces loyal to the Kurdistan Democratic Party (KDP) and those loyal to the Patriotic Union of Kurdistan (PUK), while other, minor Kurdish parties such as the Kurdistan Socialist Democratic Party also have their own small Peshmerga units. The KDP and PUK do not disclose information about the composition of their forces with government or media. Thus there is no reliable number of how many Peshmerga fighters exist. Media outlets have speculated that there are between 150,000 and 200,000 Peshmerga, but this number is highly disputed. Peshmerga have divided Kurdistan Region into a KDP-governed "yellow" zone covering Dohuk Governorate and Erbil Governorate and a PUK-governed "green" zone covering Sulaymaniyah Governorate and Halabja Governorate. Each zone has its own branch of Peshmerga with their own governing institutions that do not coordinate with the other branch.

As a result of the split nature of the Peshmerga forces, there is no central command center in charge of the entire force, and Peshmerga units instead follow separate military hierarchies depending on political allegiance. Multiple unification and depoliticizing efforts of the Peshmerga have been made since 1992. But so far all deadlines have been missed, reforms have been watered down, and most of the Peshmerga are still under the influence of the KDP and the PUK, who also maintain their separate Peshmerga forces. Following the events of the Iraqi Civil War in 2014, the United States and several Europe nations pressured the PUK and KDP to set up mixed brigades of Peshmerga as a condition for aid and funding. The PUK and KDP united 12 to 14 brigades under the Regional Guard Brigades, which were then placed under the command of the Ministry of Peshmerga Affairs. However, officers continue to report to and take orders from their party leaders who also control the deployment of forces loyal to them and appoint front-line and sector commanders

Both the KDP and the PUK rely heavily on irregulars in times of conflict to increase their ranks. However, both maintain several professional military brigades. The following units have been identified within the Peshmerga force:

Due to limited funding and the vast size of the Peshmerga forces, the KRG has long planned to downsize its forces from large numbers of low-quality forces to a smaller but much more effective and well-trained force. Consequently, in 2009, the KRG and Baghdad engaged in discussions about incorporating parts of the Peshmerga forces into the Iraqi Army in what would be the 15th and 16th Iraqi Army divisions. However, after increasing tension between Erbil and Baghdad regarding the disputed areas, the transfer was largely put on hold. Some Peshmerga were already transferred but reportedly deserted again, and there are allegations that former Peshmerga forces remained loyal to the KRG rather than their Iraqi chain of command; regardless, thousands of members of the 80 Unit of KDP and the 70 Unit of PUK are based in Baghdad, and they have good cooperation with other Iraqi forces in Baghdad.

The Peshmerga forces are secular with a Muslim majority and Assyrian and Yazidi units.

Peshmerga forces largely rely on old arms captured from battles. The Peshmerga captured stockpiles of weapons during the 1991 Iraqi uprisings. Several stockpiles of weapons were captured from the old Iraqi Army during the 2003 U.S. invasion of Iraq, in which Peshmerga forces were active. Following the retreat of the new Iraqi Army during the June 2014 Islamic State offensive, Peshmerga forces reportedly again managed to get hold of weapons left behind by the Army. Since August 2014, Peshmerga forces have also captured weapons from the Islamic State. In 2015, for the first time, Peshmerga soldiers received urban warfare and military intelligence training from foreign trainers, the Combined Joint Task Force – Operation Inherent Resolve.

The Peshmerga arsenal is limited and confined by restrictions because the Kurdish Region has to purchase arms through the Iraqi government. Due to disputes between the KRG and the Iraqi government, arms flows from Baghdad to Kurdistan Region have been almost nonexistent, as Baghdad fears Kurdish aspirations for independence. After the Islamic State offensive of August 2014, multiple governments armed the Peshmerga with some light equipment such as light arms, night goggles, and ammunition. However, Kurdish officials and Peshmerga stressed that they were not receiving enough. They also stress that Baghdad was blocking all arms from reaching the KRG, emphasizing the need for weapons to be sent directly to the KRG and not through Baghdad. Despite this, the United States has maintained that the government of Iraq is responsible for the security of Iraqi Kurdistan and that Baghdad must approve all military aid.

The Peshmerga lack a proper medical corps and communication units. This became apparent during the Islamic State offensive in 2014 where the Peshmerga found itself lacking ambulances and frontline field hospitals, forcing wounded fighters to walk back to safety. There is also a lack of communication tools, as Peshmerga commanders are forced to use civilian cellphones to communicate with each other. Under the guidance of the US-led coalition the Peshmerga has started to standardize its weapons systems, replacing Soviet-era weapons with NATO firearms.

Issues
The Peshmerga forces are plagued by frequent allegations of corruption, partisanship, nepotism, and fraud. A common result of corruption in the Peshmerga are "ghost employees" which are employees on paper who either do not exist or do not show up for work but receive a salary. Those setting up such a scam split the salary of these employees.

In addition the KDP and PUK have used the Peshmerga to exert or attempt to exert a monopoly on the use of force within their zones. In 2011 KDP Peshmerga fired on anti-government protesters in Sulaymaniyah, and the PUK later used its own security forces to break up these protests, leading to criticism from all of the opposition parties in the parliament. In 2014 the KDP used its Peshmerga to stop ministers from the Gorran Movement to enter Erbil and attend parliament.

Outside of Kurdistan Region the Peshmerga has been accused of using force to exert control of local Arab, Yazidi and Assyrian communities, particularly after taking control of areas officially outside of Kurdistan Region during the Iraqi Civil War.

Role of women

Women have played a significant role in the Peshmerga since its foundation. The Kurdish Zand tribe was known for allowing women in military roles. During the Iraqi–Kurdish conflict the majority of women served within the Peshmerga in supporting roles such as building camps, taking care of the wounded, and carrying munitions and messages. Several women brigades served on the front lines. Margaret George Malik was an iconic Assyrian guerilla fighter who was given a leading position in important battles such as the battle of Zawita Valley. The PUK started recruiting women during the Kurdish Civil War. Women were given a 45-day basic training that included parade drills and basic marksmanship with various rifles, mortars, and RPGs.

In the months leading up to the 2003 U.S. invasion of Iraq, the United States launched Operation Viking Hammer which dealt a huge blow to Islamic terrorist groups in Iraqi Kurdistan and uncovered a chemical weapons facility. The PUK later confirmed that female Kurdish fighters had participated in the operation.

The modern Peshmerga is almost entirely made up of men, while having at least 600 women in their ranks. In the KDP, these Peshmerga women have been refused access to the frontline and are mostly used in logistics and management positions, but PUK Peshmerga women are deployed in the front lines and are actively engaged in combat.

See also

 List of armed groups in the War in Iraq (2013–2017)
 Kurdish rebellion of 1983 and Al-Anfal campaign
 Sinjar massacre and Genocide of Yazidis by ISIL
 YPG
 YPJ
 PKK
 PDKI
 Zaytun Division

References

Further reading 
Simon Ross Valentine, Peshmerga: Those Who Face Death: The Kurdish Army, its History, Development, and the Fight against ISIS, Kindle Direct Publishing, 2018, 300pp. 
Chapman, Dennis P., Lieutenant Colonel USA, Security Forces of the Kurdistan Regional Government, Mohammed Najat, Costa Mesa, California: Mazda Publishers, 2011.  Reviewed by Michael M. Gunter in Middle East Affairs, Vol. 65, No. 3, Summer 2011.

External links

 Official MPA site at Kurdish Regional Government site 

 
Anti-ISIL factions in Iraq
Kurdistan Region (Iraq)
Military units and formations established in the 1920s
Organizations of the 1991 uprisings in Iraq
Military history of Kurdistan Region (Iraq)
Armies by country
1920s establishments in Iraq
Kurdish words and phrases